Kamenka is the name of several inhabited localities in Russia.

Modern localities

Altai Krai
As of 2012, three rural localities in Altai Krai bear this name:
Kamenka, Krasnogorsky District, Altai Krai, a settlement in Souskanikhinsky Selsoviet of Krasnogorsky District; 
Kamenka, Kuryinsky District, Altai Krai, a settlement in Kazantsevsky Selsoviet of Kuryinsky District; 
Kamenka, Kytmanovsky District, Altai Krai, a selo in Semeno-Krasilovsky Selsoviet of Kytmanovsky District;

Amur Oblast
As of 2012, two rural localities in Amur Oblast bear this name:
Kamenka, Arkharinsky District, Amur Oblast, a selo in Chernigovsky Rural Settlement of Arkharinsky District
Kamenka, Mazanovsky District, Amur Oblast, a selo in Beloyarovsky Rural Settlement of Mazanovsky District

Arkhangelsk Oblast
As of 2012, two rural localities in Arkhangelsk Oblast bear this name:
Kamenka, Kotlassky District, Arkhangelsk Oblast, a village in Koryazhemsky Selsoviet of Kotlassky District
Kamenka, Mezensky District, Arkhangelsk Oblast, a settlement in Mezensky District

Republic of Bashkortostan
As of 2012, three rural localities in the Republic of Bashkortostan bear this name:
Kamenka, Alsheyevsky District, Republic of Bashkortostan, a village in Chebenlinsky Selsoviet of Alsheyevsky District
Kamenka, Aurgazinsky District, Republic of Bashkortostan, a village in Meselinsky Selsoviet of Aurgazinsky District
Kamenka, Bizhbulyaksky District, Republic of Bashkortostan, a selo in Kamensky Selsoviet of Bizhbulyaksky District

Belgorod Oblast
As of 2012, one rural locality in Belgorod Oblast bears this name:
Kamenka, Belgorod Oblast, a selo in Novoukolovsky Rural Okrug of Krasnensky District

Bryansk Oblast
As of 2012, three rural localities in Bryansk Oblast bear this name:
Kamenka, Brasovsky District, Bryansk Oblast, a settlement under the administrative jurisdiction of Lokotskoy Settlement Administrative Okrug in Brasovsky District; 
Kamenka, Klimovsky District, Bryansk Oblast, a selo in Plavensky Rural Administrative Okrug of Klimovsky District; 
Kamenka, Krasnogorsky District, Bryansk Oblast, a settlement in Kolyudovsky Rural Administrative Okrug of Krasnogorsky District;

Chelyabinsk Oblast
As of 2012, two rural localities in Chelyabinsk Oblast bear this name:
Kamenka, Kizilsky District, Chelyabinsk Oblast, a settlement in Bogdanovsky Selsoviet of Kizilsky District
Kamenka, Troitsky District, Chelyabinsk Oblast, a settlement in Kosobrodsky Selsoviet of Troitsky District

Irkutsk Oblast
As of 2012, three rural localities in Irkutsk Oblast bear this name:
Kamenka, Nizhneudinsky District, Irkutsk Oblast, a selo in Nizhneudinsky District
Kamenka, Bayandayevsky District, Irkutsk Oblast, a settlement in Bayandayevsky District
Kamenka, Bokhansky District, Irkutsk Oblast, a selo in Bokhansky District

Ivanovo Oblast
As of 2012, one urban locality in Ivanovo Oblast bears this name:
Kamenka, Ivanovo Oblast, a settlement in Vichugsky District

Kabardino-Balkarian Republic
As of 2012, one rural locality in the Kabardino-Balkarian Republic bears this name:
Kamenka, Kabardino-Balkarian Republic, a selo in Chegemsky District;

Kaliningrad Oblast
As of 2012, five rural localities in Kaliningrad Oblast bear this name:
Kamenka, Bagrationovsky District, Kaliningrad Oblast, a settlement in Dolgorukovsky Rural Okrug of Bagrationovsky District
Kamenka, Guryevsky District, Kaliningrad Oblast, a settlement in Lugovskoy Rural Okrug of Guryevsky District
Kamenka, Polessky District, Kaliningrad Oblast, a settlement in Turgenevsky Rural Okrug of Polessky District
Kamenka, Pravdinsky District, Kaliningrad Oblast, a settlement under the administrative jurisdiction of the urban-type settlement of district significance of Zheleznodorozhny in Pravdinsky District
Kamenka, Zelenogradsky District, Kaliningrad Oblast, a settlement in Kovrovsky Rural Okrug of Zelenogradsky District

Kaluga Oblast
As of 2012, nine rural localities in Kaluga Oblast bear this name:
Kamenka (Asmolovo Rural Settlement), Baryatinsky District, Kaluga Oblast, a village in Baryatinsky District; municipally, a part of Asmolovo Rural Settlement of that district
Kamenka (Bakhmutovo Rural Settlement), Baryatinsky District, Kaluga Oblast, a village in Baryatinsky District; municipally, a part of Bakhmutovo Rural Settlement of that district
Kamenka, Duminichsky District, Kaluga Oblast, a village in Duminichsky District
Kamenka (selo Ferzikovo Rural Settlement), Ferzikovsky District, Kaluga Oblast, a village in Ferzikovsky District; municipally, a part of selo Ferzikovo Rural Settlement of that district
Kamenka (Sugonovo Rural Settlement), Ferzikovsky District, Kaluga Oblast, a village in Ferzikovsky District; municipally, a part of Sugonovo Rural Settlement of that district
Kamenka, Kozelsky District, Kaluga Oblast, a village in Kozelsky District
Kamenka, Meshchovsky District, Kaluga Oblast, a village in Meshchovsky District
Kamenka, Mosalsky District, Kaluga Oblast, a village in Mosalsky District
Kamenka, Zhizdrinsky District, Kaluga Oblast, a village in Zhizdrinsky District

Kemerovo Oblast
As of 2012, two rural localities in Kemerovo Oblast bear this name:
Kamenka, Krapivinsky District, Kemerovo Oblast, a selo in Kamenskaya Rural Territory of Krapivinsky District; 
Kamenka, Promyshlennovsky District, Kemerovo Oblast, a village in Pushkinskaya Rural Territory of Promyshlennovsky District;

Khabarovsk Krai
As of 2012, one rural locality in Khabarovsk Krai bears this name:
Kamenka, Khabarovsk Krai, a hydrologic post in imeni Poliny Osipenko District

Kostroma Oblast
As of 2012, three rural localities in Kostroma Oblast bear this name:
Kamenka, Buysky District, Kostroma Oblast, a village in Tsentralnoye Settlement of Buysky District; 
Kamenka, Nerekhtsky District, Kostroma Oblast, a village in Voskresenskoye Settlement of Nerekhtsky District; 
Kamenka, Vokhomsky District, Kostroma Oblast, a village in Belkovskoye Settlement of Vokhomsky District;

Krasnoyarsk Krai
As of 2012, four rural localities in Krasnoyarsk Krai bear this name:
Kamenka, Abansky District, Krasnoyarsk Krai, a village in Apano-Klyuchinsky Selsoviet of Abansky District
Kamenka, Achinsky District, Krasnoyarsk Krai, a village in Klyuchinsky Selsoviet of Achinsky District
Kamenka, Boguchansky District, Krasnoyarsk Krai, a village in Boguchansky District
Kamenka, Irbeysky District, Krasnoyarsk Krai, a village in Ust-Yarulsky Selsoviet of Irbeysky District

Kursk Oblast
As of 2012, four rural localities in Kursk Oblast bear this name:
Kamenka, Dmitriyevsky District, Kursk Oblast, a settlement in Paltsevsky Selsoviet of Dmitriyevsky District
Kamenka, Gorshechensky District, Kursk Oblast, a village in Znamensky Selsoviet of Gorshechensky District
Kamenka, Oboyansky District, Kursk Oblast, a selo in Kamensky Selsoviet of Oboyansky District
Kamenka, Zolotukhinsky District, Kursk Oblast, a khutor in Belokolodezsky Selsoviet of Zolotukhinsky District

Leningrad Oblast
As of 2012, seven rural localities in Leningrad Oblast bear this name:
Kamenka, Luzhsky District, Leningrad Oblast, a village in Zaklinskoye Settlement Municipal Formation of Luzhsky District; 
Kamenka, Slantsevsky District, Leningrad Oblast, a village under the administrative jurisdiction of Slantsevskoye Settlement Municipal Formation in Slantsevsky District; 
Kamenka, Tosnensky District, Leningrad Oblast, a village in Lisinskoye Settlement Municipal Formation of Tosnensky District; 
Kamenka, Berezhkovskoye Settlement Municipal Formation, Volkhovsky District, Leningrad Oblast, a village in Berezhkovskoye Settlement Municipal Formation of Volkhovsky District; 
Kamenka, Kolchanovskoye Settlement Municipal Formation, Volkhovsky District, Leningrad Oblast, a village in Kolchanovskoye Settlement Municipal Formation of Volkhovsky District; 
Kamenka, Vsevolozhsky District, Leningrad Oblast, a village in Shcheglovskoye Settlement Municipal Formation of Vsevolozhsky District; 
Kamenka, Vyborgsky District, Leningrad Oblast, a settlement in Polyanskoye Settlement Municipal Formation of Vyborgsky District;

Lipetsk Oblast
As of 2012, six rural localities in Lipetsk Oblast bear this name:
Kamenka, Dankovsky District, Lipetsk Oblast, a village in Yagodnovsky Selsoviet of Dankovsky District; 
Kamenka, Dolgorukovsky District, Lipetsk Oblast, a village in Veselovsky Selsoviet of Dolgorukovsky District; 
Kamenka, Izmalkovsky District, Lipetsk Oblast, a village in Petrovsky Selsoviet of Izmalkovsky District; 
Kamenka, Krasninsky District, Lipetsk Oblast, a village in Krasninsky Selsoviet of Krasninsky District; 
Kamenka, Terbunsky District, Lipetsk Oblast, a selo in Ozersky Selsoviet of Terbunsky District; 
Kamenka, Zadonsky District, Lipetsk Oblast, a selo in Kamensky Selsoviet of Zadonsky District;

Republic of Mordovia
As of 2012, four rural localities in the Republic of Mordovia bear this name:
Kamenka, Atyashevsky District, Republic of Mordovia, a selo in Kamensky Selsoviet of Atyashevsky District; 
Kamenka, Atyuryevsky District, Republic of Mordovia, a selo in Kamensky Selsoviet of Atyuryevsky District; 
Kamenka, Chamzinsky District, Republic of Mordovia, a village in Sabur-Machkassky Selsoviet of Chamzinsky District; 
Kamenka, Romodanovsky District, Republic of Mordovia, a village in Konstantinovsky Selsoviet of Romodanovsky District;

Moscow
As of 2012, two rural localities in Troitsky Administrative Okrug of the federal city of Moscow bear this name:
Kamenka, Rogovskoye Settlement, Troitsky Administrative Okrug, Moscow, a village in Rogovskoye Settlement
Kamenka, Pervomayskoye Settlement, Troitsky Administrative Okrug, Moscow, a village in Pervomayskoye Settlement

Moscow Oblast
As of 2012, eleven rural localities in Moscow Oblast bear this name:
Kamenka, Dmitrovsky District, Moscow Oblast, a village in Gabovskoye Rural Settlement of Dmitrovsky District
Kamenka, Kashirsky District, Moscow Oblast, a village in Domninskoye Rural Settlement of Kashirsky District
Kamenka, Khoroshovskoye Rural Settlement, Kolomensky District, Moscow Oblast, a village in Khoroshovskoye Rural Settlement of Kolomensky District
Kamenka, Provodnikovskoye Rural Settlement, Kolomensky District, Moscow Oblast, a village in Provodnikovskoye Rural Settlement of Kolomensky District
Kamenka, Mozhaysky District, Moscow Oblast, a village in Poretskoye Rural Settlement of Mozhaysky District
Kamenka, Naro-Fominsky District, Moscow Oblast, a village under the administrative jurisdiction of the Town of Vereya in Naro-Fominsky District
Kamenka, Ozyorsky District, Moscow Oblast, a village in Boyarkinskoye Rural Settlement of Ozyorsky District
Kamenka, Serpukhovsky District, Moscow Oblast, a village in Vasilyevskoye Rural Settlement of Serpukhovsky District
Kamenka, Aksinyinskoye Rural Settlement, Stupinsky District, Moscow Oblast, a village in Aksinyinskoye Rural Settlement of Stupinsky District
Kamenka, Malino, Stupinsky District, Moscow Oblast, a village under the administrative jurisdiction of Malino Work Settlement in Stupinsky District
Kamenka, Stupino, Stupinsky District, Moscow Oblast, a village under the administrative jurisdiction of the Town of Stupino in Stupinsky District

Nenets Autonomous Okrug
As of 2012, one rural locality in Nenets Autonomous Okrug bears this name:
Kamenka, Nenets Autonomous Okrug, a village in Pustozersky Selsoviet of Zapolyarny District

Nizhny Novgorod Oblast
As of 2012, eleven rural localities in Nizhny Novgorod Oblast bear this name:
Kamenka, Arzamassky District, Nizhny Novgorod Oblast, a selo in Abramovsky Selsoviet of Arzamassky District
Kamenka, Kstovsky District, Nizhny Novgorod Oblast, a village in Chernukhinsky Selsoviet of Kstovsky District
Kamenka, Lyskovsky District, Nizhny Novgorod Oblast, a selo in Berendeyevsky Selsoviet of Lyskovsky District
Kamenka, Perevozsky District, Nizhny Novgorod Oblast, a village in Paletsky Selsoviet of Perevozsky District
Kamenka, Pilninsky District, Nizhny Novgorod Oblast, a selo in Medyansky Selsoviet of Pilninsky District
Kamenka, Pelya-Khovansky Selsoviet, Pochinkovsky District, Nizhny Novgorod Oblast, a village in Pelya-Khovansky Selsoviet of Pochinkovsky District
Kamenka, Rizovatovsky Selsoviet, Pochinkovsky District, Nizhny Novgorod Oblast, a settlement in Rizovatovsky Selsoviet of Pochinkovsky District
Kamenka, Sergachsky District, Nizhny Novgorod Oblast, a village in Staroberezovsky Selsoviet of Sergachsky District
Kamenka, Vetluzhsky District, Nizhny Novgorod Oblast, a village in Kruttsovsky Selsoviet of Vetluzhsky District
Kamenka, Vorotynsky District, Nizhny Novgorod Oblast, a selo in Kamensky Selsoviet of Vorotynsky District
Kamenka, Voskresensky District, Nizhny Novgorod Oblast, a village in Vladimirsky Selsoviet of Voskresensky District

Novgorod Oblast
As of 2012, fourteen rural localities in Novgorod Oblast bear this name:
Kamenka, Pesotskoye Settlement, Demyansky District, Novgorod Oblast, a village in Pesotskoye Settlement of Demyansky District
Kamenka, Zhirkovskoye Settlement, Demyansky District, Novgorod Oblast, a village in Zhirkovskoye Settlement of Demyansky District
Kamenka, Krasnoborskoye Settlement, Kholmsky District, Novgorod Oblast, a village in Krasnoborskoye Settlement of Kholmsky District
Kamenka, Togodskoye Settlement, Kholmsky District, Novgorod Oblast, a village in Togodskoye Settlement of Kholmsky District
Kamenka, Khvoyninsky District, Novgorod Oblast, a village in Ostakhnovskoye Settlement of Khvoyninsky District
Kamenka, Novorakhinskoye Settlement, Krestetsky District, Novgorod Oblast, a village in Novorakhinskoye Settlement of Krestetsky District
Kamenka, Zaytsevskoye Settlement, Krestetsky District, Novgorod Oblast, a village in Zaytsevskoye Settlement of Krestetsky District
Kamenka, Lyubytinsky District, Novgorod Oblast, a village under the administrative jurisdiction of the settlement of Lyubytinskoye in Lyubytinsky District
Kamenka, Malovishersky District, Novgorod Oblast, a village in Burginskoye Settlement of Malovishersky District
Kamenka, Pestovsky District, Novgorod Oblast, a village in Pestovskoye Settlement of Pestovsky District
Kamenka, Poddorsky District, Novgorod Oblast, a village in Belebelkovskoye Settlement of Poddorsky District
Kamenka, Dubrovskoye Settlement, Soletsky District, Novgorod Oblast, a village in Dubrovskoye Settlement of Soletsky District
Kamenka, Gorskoye Settlement, Soletsky District, Novgorod Oblast, a village in Gorskoye Settlement of Soletsky District
Kamenka, Starorussky District, Novgorod Oblast, a village in Novoselskoye Settlement of Starorussky District

Novosibirsk Oblast
As of 2012, four rural localities in Novosibirsk Oblast bear this name:
Kamenka, Iskitimsky District, Novosibirsk Oblast, a settlement in Iskitimsky District
Kamenka, Moshkovsky District, Novosibirsk Oblast, a settlement in Moshkovsky District
Kamenka, Novosibirsky District, Novosibirsk Oblast, a selo in Novosibirsky District
Kamenka, Ubinsky District, Novosibirsk Oblast, a village in Ubinsky District

Omsk Oblast
As of 2012, one rural locality in Omsk Oblast bears this name:
Kamenka, Omsk Oblast, a village in Yeremeyevsky Rural Okrug of Poltavsky District

Orenburg Oblast
As of 2012, five rural localities in Orenburg Oblast bear this name:
Kamenka, Alexandrovsky District, Orenburg Oblast, a selo in Zhdanovsky Selsoviet of Alexandrovsky District
Kamenka, Grachyovsky District, Orenburg Oblast, a selo in Grachevsky Selsoviet of Grachyovsky District
Kamenka, Oktyabrsky District, Orenburg Oblast, a selo in Maryevsky Selsoviet of Oktyabrsky District
Kamenka, Sakmarsky District, Orenburg Oblast, a selo in Kamensky Selsoviet of Sakmarsky District
Kamenka, Sorochinsky District, Orenburg Oblast, a selo in Mikhaylovsky Vtoroy Selsoviet of Sorochinsky District

Oryol Oblast
As of 2012, twelve rural localities in Oryol Oblast bear this name:
Kamenka, Bolkhovsky District, Oryol Oblast, a settlement in Novosinetsky Selsoviet of Bolkhovsky District
Kamenka, Glazunovsky District, Oryol Oblast, a village in Medvedevsky Selsoviet of Glazunovsky District
Kamenka, Krasnozorensky District, Oryol Oblast, a village in Krasnozorensky Selsoviet of Krasnozorensky District
Kamenka, Leninsky Selsoviet, Maloarkhangelsky District, Oryol Oblast, a village in Leninsky Selsoviet of Maloarkhangelsky District
Kamenka, Lukovsky Selsoviet, Maloarkhangelsky District, Oryol Oblast, a village in Lukovsky Selsoviet of Maloarkhangelsky District
Kamenka, Mtsensky District, Oryol Oblast, a village in Bashkatovsky Selsoviet of Mtsensky District
Kamenka, Orlovsky District, Oryol Oblast, a selo in Zhilyayevsky Selsoviet of Orlovsky District
Kamenka, Pokrovsky District, Oryol Oblast, a village in Mokhovskoy Selsoviet of Pokrovsky District
Kamenka, Russko-Brodsky Selsoviet, Verkhovsky District, Oryol Oblast, a village in Russko-Brodsky Selsoviet of Verkhovsky District
Kamenka, Turovsky Selsoviet, Verkhovsky District, Oryol Oblast, a selo in Turovsky Selsoviet of Verkhovsky District
Kamenka, Zalegoshchensky District, Oryol Oblast, a village in Lomovsky Selsoviet of Zalegoshchensky District
Kamenka, Znamensky District, Oryol Oblast, a village in Koptevsky Selsoviet of Znamensky District

Penza Oblast
As of 2012, five inhabited localities in Penza Oblast bear this name:

Urban localities
Kamenka, Kamensky District, Penza Oblast, a town in Kamensky District

Rural localities
Kamenka, Bashmakovsky District, Penza Oblast, a selo in Boyarovsky Selsoviet of Bashmakovsky District
Kamenka, Kuznetsky District, Penza Oblast, a selo in Yasnopolyansky Selsoviet of Kuznetsky District
Kamenka, Tamalinsky District, Penza Oblast, a selo in Ulyanovsky Selsoviet of Tamalinsky District
Kamenka, Vadinsky District, Penza Oblast, a village in Bolshelukinsky Selsoviet of Vadinsky District

Perm Krai
As of 2012, five rural localities in Perm Krai bear this name:
Kamenka, Kungursky District, Perm Krai, a village in Kungursky District
Kamenka, Osinsky District, Perm Krai, a village in Osinsky District
Kamenka, Sivinsky District, Perm Krai, a village in Sivinsky District
Kamenka, Suksunsky District, Perm Krai, a village in Suksunsky District
Kamenka, Vereshchaginsky District, Perm Krai, a village in Vereshchaginsky District

Primorsky Krai
As of 2012, two rural localities in Primorsky Krai bear this name:
Kamenka, Dalnegorsk, Primorsky Krai, a selo under the administrative jurisdiction of Dalnegorsk Town Under Krai Jurisdiction
Kamenka, Chuguyevsky District, Primorsky Krai, a selo in Chuguyevsky District

Pskov Oblast
As of 2012, twenty-four rural localities in Pskov Oblast bear this name:
Kamenka, Bezhanitsky District, Pskov Oblast, a village in Bezhanitsky District
Kamenka, Dedovichsky District, Pskov Oblast, a village in Dedovichsky District
Kamenka, Dnovsky District, Pskov Oblast, a village in Dnovsky District
Kamenka, Gdovsky District, Pskov Oblast, a village in Gdovsky District
Kamenka (Podberezinskaya Rural Settlement), Loknyansky District, Pskov Oblast, a village in Loknyansky District; municipally, a part of Podberezinskaya Rural Settlement of that district
Kamenka (Miritinitskaya Rural Settlement), Loknyansky District, Pskov Oblast, a village in Loknyansky District; municipally, a part of Miritinitskaya Rural Settlement of that district
Kamenka, Nevelsky District, Pskov Oblast, a village in Nevelsky District
Kamenka (Makushinskaya Rural Settlement), Opochetsky District, Pskov Oblast, a village in Opochetsky District; municipally, a part of Makushinskaya Rural Settlement of that district
Kamenka (Varyginskaya Rural Settlement), Opochetsky District, Pskov Oblast, a village in Opochetsky District; municipally, a part of Varyginskaya Rural Settlement of that district
Kamenka (Vorontsovskaya Rural Settlement), Ostrovsky District, Pskov Oblast, a village in Ostrovsky District; municipally, a part of Vorontsovskaya Rural Settlement of that district
Kamenka (Gorayskaya Rural Settlement), Ostrovsky District, Pskov Oblast, a village in Ostrovsky District; municipally, a part of Gorayskaya Rural Settlement of that district
Kamenka (Volkovskaya Rural Settlement), Ostrovsky District, Pskov Oblast, a village in Ostrovsky District; municipally, a part of Volkovskaya Rural Settlement of that district
Kamenka (Kuleyskaya Rural Settlement), Pechorsky District, Pskov Oblast, a village in Pechorsky District; municipally, a part of Kuleyskaya Rural Settlement of that district
Kamenka (Izborskaya Rural Settlement), Pechorsky District, Pskov Oblast, a village in Pechorsky District; municipally, a part of Izborskaya Rural Settlement of that district
Kamenka, Plyussky District, Pskov Oblast, a village in Plyussky District
Kamenka (Tugotinskaya Rural Settlement), Porkhovsky District, Pskov Oblast, a village in Porkhovsky District; municipally, a part of Tugotinskaya Rural Settlement of that district
Kamenka (Slavkovskaya Rural Settlement), Porkhovsky District, Pskov Oblast, a village in Porkhovsky District; municipally, a part of Slavkovskaya Rural Settlement of that district
Kamenka (Polonskaya Rural Settlement), Porkhovsky District, Pskov Oblast, a village in Porkhovsky District; municipally, a part of Polonskaya Rural Settlement of that district
Kamenka, Pskovsky District, Pskov Oblast, a village in Pskovsky District
Kamenka (Zabelskaya Rural Settlement), Pustoshkinsky District, Pskov Oblast, a village in Pustoshkinsky District; municipally, a part of Zabelskaya Rural Settlement of that district
Kamenka (Shchukinskaya Rural Settlement), Pustoshkinsky District, Pskov Oblast, a village in Pustoshkinsky District; municipally, a part of Shchukinskaya Rural Settlement of that district
Kamenka (Cherpesskaya Rural Settlement), Velikoluksky District, Pskov Oblast, a village in Velikoluksky District; municipally, a part of Cherpesskaya Rural Settlement of that district
Kamenka (Lychevskaya Rural Settlement), Velikoluksky District, Pskov Oblast, a village in Velikoluksky District; municipally, a part of Lychevskaya Rural Settlement of that district
Kamenka (Bukrovskaya Rural Settlement), Velikoluksky District, Pskov Oblast, a village in Velikoluksky District; municipally, a part of Bukrovskaya Rural Settlement of that district

Rostov Oblast
As of 2012, three rural localities in Rostov Oblast bear this name:
Kamenka, Bokovsky District, Rostov Oblast, a khutor in Krasnokutskoye Rural Settlement of Bokovsky District
Kamenka, Kasharsky District, Rostov Oblast, a selo in Popovskoye Rural Settlement of Kasharsky District
Kamenka, Millerovsky District, Rostov Oblast, a khutor in Krivorozhskoye Rural Settlement of Millerovsky District

Ryazan Oblast
As of 2012, four rural localities in Ryazan Oblast bear this name:
Kamenka, Korablinsky District, Ryazan Oblast, a village in Nikitinsky Rural Okrug of Korablinsky District
Kamenka, Pitelinsky District, Ryazan Oblast, a village in Petsky Rural Okrug of Pitelinsky District
Kamenka, Sasovsky District, Ryazan Oblast, a village in Pridorozhny Rural Okrug of Sasovsky District
Kamenka, Spassky District, Ryazan Oblast, a village in Ogorodnikovsky Rural Okrug of Spassky District

Samara Oblast
As of 2012, two rural localities in Samara Oblast bear this name:
Kamenka, Isaklinsky District, Samara Oblast, a settlement in Isaklinsky District
Kamenka, Shentalinsky District, Samara Oblast, a selo in Shentalinsky District

Saratov Oblast
As of 2012, six rural localities in Saratov Oblast bear this name:
Kamenka, Krasnoarmeysky District, Saratov Oblast, a selo in Krasnoarmeysky District
Kamenka, Marksovsky District, Saratov Oblast, a selo in Marksovsky District
Kamenka, Pugachyovsky District, Saratov Oblast, a selo in Pugachyovsky District
Kamenka, Rtishchevsky District, Saratov Oblast, a selo in Rtishchevsky District
Kamenka, Samoylovsky District, Saratov Oblast, a selo in Samoylovsky District
Kamenka, Turkovsky District, Saratov Oblast, a selo in Turkovsky District

Smolensk Oblast
As of 2012, eleven rural localities in Smolensk Oblast bear this name:
Kamenka, Demidovsky District, Smolensk Oblast, a village in Kartsevskoye Rural Settlement of Demidovsky District
Kamenka, Dukhovshchinsky District, Smolensk Oblast, a village in Bulgakovskoye Rural Settlement of Dukhovshchinsky District
Kamenka, Gagarinsky District, Smolensk Oblast, a village in Pokrovskoye Rural Settlement of Gagarinsky District
Kamenka, Glinkovsky District, Smolensk Oblast, a village in Boltutinskoye Rural Settlement of Glinkovsky District
Kamenka, Kardymovsky District, Smolensk Oblast, a village in Kamenskoye Rural Settlement of Kardymovsky District
Kamenka, Roslavlsky District, Smolensk Oblast, a village in Kostyrevskoye Rural Settlement of Roslavlsky District
Kamenka, Rudnyansky District, Smolensk Oblast, a village in Ponizovskoye Rural Settlement of Rudnyansky District
Kamenka, Smolensky District, Smolensk Oblast, a village in Novoselskoye Rural Settlement of Smolensky District
Kamenka, Ugransky District, Smolensk Oblast, a village in Kholmovskoye Rural Settlement of Ugransky District
Kamenka, Meshcherskoye Rural Settlement, Vyazemsky District, Smolensk Oblast, a village in Meshcherskoye Rural Settlement of Vyazemsky District
Kamenka, Tumanovskoye Rural Settlement, Vyazemsky District, Smolensk Oblast, a village in Tumanovskoye Rural Settlement of Vyazemsky District

Stavropol Krai
As of 2012, one rural locality in Stavropol Krai bears this name:
Kamenka, Stavropol Krai, a settlement in Kamennobalkovsky Selsoviet of Blagodarnensky District

Sverdlovsk Oblast
As of 2012, seven rural localities in Sverdlovsk Oblast bear this name:
Kamenka, Krasnouralsk, Sverdlovsk Oblast, a settlement in Dachny Selsoviet under the administrative jurisdiction of the Town of Krasnouralsk
Kamenka, Pervouralsk, Sverdlovsk Oblast, a village in Nizhneselsky Selsoviet under the administrative jurisdiction of the City of Pervouralsk
Kamenka, Artyomovsky District, Sverdlovsk Oblast, a settlement in Lebedkinsky Selsoviet of Artyomovsky District
Kamenka, Beloyarsky District, Sverdlovsk Oblast, a settlement in Rezhikovsky Selsoviet of Beloyarsky District
Kamenka, Novolyalinsky District, Sverdlovsk Oblast, a settlement under the administrative jurisdiction of the Town of Novaya Lyalya in Novolyalinsky District
Kamenka, Rezhevskoy District, Sverdlovsk Oblast, a selo in Klevakinsky Selsoviet of Rezhevsky District
Kamenka, Sysertsky District, Sverdlovsk Oblast, a settlement under the administrative jurisdiction of the Town of Sysert in Sysertsky District

Tambov Oblast
As of 2012, one rural locality in Tambov Oblast bears this name:
Kamenka, Tambov Oblast, a selo in Kamensky Selsoviet of Rzhaksinsky District

Republic of Tatarstan
As of 2012, two rural localities in the Republic of Tatarstan bear this name:
Kamenka, Almetyevsky District, Republic of Tatarstan, a settlement in Almetyevsky District
Kamenka, Aznakayevsky District, Republic of Tatarstan, a village in Aznakayevsky District

Tula Oblast
As of 2012, eleven rural localities in Tula Oblast bear this name:
Kamenka, Belyovsky District, Tula Oblast, a village in Rovensky Rural Okrug of Belyovsky District
Kamenka, Bogoroditsky District, Tula Oblast, a village in Korsakovsky Rural Okrug of Bogoroditsky District
Kamenka, Kimovsky District, Tula Oblast, a village in Krasnopolsky Rural Okrug of Kimovsky District
Kamenka, Kireyevsky District, Tula Oblast, a village in Bolshekalmyksky Rural Okrug of Kireyevsky District
Kamenka, Prishnenskaya Rural Administration, Shchyokinsky District, Tula Oblast, a village in Prishnenskaya Rural Administration of Shchyokinsky District
Kamenka, Zherdevskaya Rural Administration, Shchyokinsky District, Tula Oblast, a selo in Zherdevskaya Rural Administration of Shchyokinsky District
Kamenka, Uzlovsky District, Tula Oblast, a selo in Kamenskaya Rural Administration of Uzlovsky District
Kamenka, Venyovsky District, Tula Oblast, a village in Mordvessky Rural Okrug of Venyovsky District
Kamenka, Yasnogorsky District, Tula Oblast, a village in Arkhangelskaya Rural Territory of Yasnogorsky District
Kamenka, Yefremovsky District, Tula Oblast, a village in Stepnokhutorskoy Rural Okrug of Yefremovsky District
Kamenka, Zaoksky District, Tula Oblast, a selo in Pakhomovsky Rural Okrug of Zaoksky District

Tver Oblast
As of 2012, fifteen rural localities in Tver Oblast bear this name:
Kamenka, Firovsky District, Tver Oblast, a village in Rozhdestvenskoye Rural Settlement of Firovsky District
Kamenka, Kalininsky District, Tver Oblast, a village in Burashevskoye Rural Settlement of Kalininsky District
Kamenka, Kalyazinsky District, Tver Oblast, a village in Alferovskoye Rural Settlement of Kalyazinsky District
Kamenka, Krasnokholmsky District, Tver Oblast, a village in Barbinskoye Rural Settlement of Krasnokholmsky District
Kamenka, Lesnoy District, Tver Oblast, a village in Medvedkovskoye Rural Settlement of Lesnoy District
Kamenka, Maksatikhinsky District, Tver Oblast, a village in Kamenskoye Rural Settlement of Maksatikhinsky District
Kamenka, Molokovsky District, Tver Oblast, a village in Deledinskoye Rural Settlement of Molokovsky District
Kamenka, Nelidovsky District, Tver Oblast, a village in Selyanskoye Rural Settlement of Nelidovsky District
Kamenka, Gusevskoye Rural Settlement, Oleninsky District, Tver Oblast, a village in Gusevskoye Rural Settlement of Oleninsky District
Kamenka, Kholmetskoye Rural Settlement, Oleninsky District, Tver Oblast, a village in Kholmetskoye Rural Settlement of Oleninsky District
Kamenka, Rameshkovsky District, Tver Oblast, a village in Nekrasovo Rural Settlement of Rameshkovsky District
Kamenka, Selizharovsky District, Tver Oblast, a village in Berezugskoye Rural Settlement of Selizharovsky District
Kamenka, Toropetsky District, Tver Oblast, a village in Rechanskoye Rural Settlement of Toropetsky District
Kamenka, Udomelsky District, Tver Oblast, a village in Porozhkinskoye Rural Settlement of Udomelsky District
Kamenka, Vesyegonsky District, Tver Oblast, a village in Romanovskoye Rural Settlement of Vesyegonsky District

Tyumen Oblast
As of 2012, two rural localities in Tyumen Oblast bear this name:
Kamenka, Tyumensky District, Tyumen Oblast, a selo in Kamensky Rural Okrug of Tyumensky District
Kamenka, Zavodoukovsky District, Tyumen Oblast, a village in Zavodoukovsky District

Ulyanovsk Oblast
As of 2012, one rural locality in Ulyanovsk Oblast bears this name:
Kamenka, Ulyanovsk Oblast, a settlement under the administrative jurisdiction of Leninsky City District of the city of oblast significance of Ulyanovsk

Vladimir Oblast
As of 2012, three rural localities in Vladimir Oblast bear this name:
Kamenka, Alexandrovsky District, Vladimir Oblast, a village in Alexandrovsky District
Kamenka, Melenkovsky District, Vladimir Oblast, a village in Melenkovsky District
Kamenka, Yuryev-Polsky District, Vladimir Oblast, a selo in Yuryev-Polsky District

Volgograd Oblast
As of 2012, three rural localities in Volgograd Oblast bear this name:
Kamenka, Novonikolayevsky District, Volgograd Oblast, a khutor in Serpo-Molotsky Selsoviet of Novonikolayevsky District
Kamenka, Oktyabrsky District, Volgograd Oblast, a selo in Kovalevsky Selsoviet of Oktyabrsky District
Kamenka, Uryupinsky District, Volgograd Oblast, a khutor in Olshansky Selsoviet of Uryupinsky District

Vologda Oblast
As of 2012, five rural localities in Vologda Oblast bear this name:
Kamenka, Kamensky Selsoviet, Gryazovetsky District, Vologda Oblast, a settlement in Kamensky Selsoviet of Gryazovetsky District
Kamenka, Vokhtogsky Selsoviet, Gryazovetsky District, Vologda Oblast, a village in Vokhtogsky Selsoviet of Gryazovetsky District
Kamenka, Krasnopolyansky Selsoviet, Nikolsky District, Vologda Oblast, a village in Krasnopolyansky Selsoviet of Nikolsky District
Kamenka, Milofanovsky Selsoviet, Nikolsky District, Vologda Oblast, a village in Milofanovsky Selsoviet of Nikolsky District
Kamenka, Verkhovazhsky District, Vologda Oblast, a settlement in Chushevitsky Selsoviet of Verkhovazhsky District

Voronezh Oblast
As of 2012, four inhabited localities in Voronezh Oblast bear this name:

Urban localities
Kamenka, Kamensky District, Voronezh Oblast, an urban-type settlement in Kamensky District

Rural localities
Kamenka, Povorinsky District, Voronezh Oblast, a selo in Baychurovskoye Rural Settlement of Povorinsky District
Kamenka, Semiluksky District, Voronezh Oblast, a khutor in Starovedugskoye Rural Settlement of Semiluksky District
Kamenka, Vorobyovsky District, Voronezh Oblast, a selo in Solonetskoye Rural Settlement of Vorobyovsky District

Yaroslavl Oblast
As of 2012, three rural localities in Yaroslavl Oblast bear this name:
Kamenka, Poshekhonsky District, Yaroslavl Oblast, a village in Fedorkovsky Rural Okrug of Poshekhonsky District
Kamenka, Tutayevsky District, Yaroslavl Oblast, a village in Nikolo-Edomsky Rural Okrug of Tutayevsky District
Kamenka, Yaroslavsky District, Yaroslavl Oblast, a village in Kuznechikhinsky Rural Okrug of Yaroslavsky District

Zabaykalsky Krai
As of 2012, one rural locality in Zabaykalsky Krai bears this name:
Kamenka, Zabaykalsky Krai, a settlement in Chitinsky District

Abolished localities
Kamenka, Bolshesosnovsky District, Perm Krai, a village in Bolshesosnovsky District of Perm Krai; abolished in December 2011

Renamed localities
Kamenka, name of Novaya Kamenka, a village in Zaytsevskoye Settlement of Krestetsky District in Novgorod Oblast, before June 2011
Kamenka, name of Staraya Kamenka, a village in Dubrovskoye Settlement of Soletsky District in Novgorod Oblast, before June 2011

Alternative names
Kamenka, alternative name of Kamennaya Lyvka, a village in Pavinskoye Settlement of Pavinsky District in Kostroma Oblast; 
Kamenka, alternative name of Bolshaya Kamenka, a village in Noskovskoye Settlement of Pyshchugsky District in Kostroma Oblast; 
Kamenka, alternative name of Kamenka (v tom chisle razyezd Svechinsky), a village in Tulsky Selsoviet of Terbunsky District in Lipetsk Oblast; 
Kamenka, alternative name of Vtoraya Kamenka, a selo in Vtorokamensky Selsoviet of Loktevsky District in Altai Krai; 
Kamenka, alternative name of Pervokamenka, a selo in Pervokamensky Selsoviet of Tretyakovsky District in Altai Krai; 
Kamenka, alternative name of Kamennoye, a selo in Bolshesamovetsky Selsoviet of Gryazinsky District in Lipetsk Oblast;